May Sybil Leslie (14 August 1887 – 3 July 1937) was an English chemist who worked with Marie Curie and Ernest Rutherford. From 1920 until her death Leslie was a Fellow of the Royal Society of Chemistry.

Biography
Leslie was born to Frederick Leslie, a coal miner and bookseller, and Elizabeth Dickinson. She was educated in Leeds, graduating from a high school in 1905. She received her BSc in chemistry with first-class honors from the University of Leeds in 1908.The following year, she was awarded an M.Sc. for research with H.M.Dawson on the kinetics of the iodination of acetone. In that same she worked as a research assistant to Marie Curie in Paris (1909–1911) and wrote several articles in French on extraction of new elements from thorium and their properties. Upon recommendation from Curie, she then moved to Manchester to work on the properties of thorium and actinium with Ernest Rutherford at the Physical Laboratory of the Victoria University, Manchester. (1911–1912). After leaving Manchester she worked as a high school teacher in West Hartlepool (1912–1913) and as an assistant lecturer and demonstrator in chemistry at the University College in Bangor, Wales (1914–1915).

During World War I Leslie worked on large-scale manufacture of explosives in Liverpool. Women were held in low esteem in science and engineering in those years. Thus both her Bangor and Liverpool appointments were unusual and could be explained by the shortage of men during the war. She had lost her job in explosives research in 1917 upon return of male engineers from the front.

In 1918 Leslie was awarded a doctoral degree by the University of Leeds for her combined work on thorium and explosives. The same year she became a demonstrator in chemistry at Leeds and in 1928 a full lecturer in physical chemistry. During those years her research mostly focused on the chemistry of synthetic dyes. Back in 1920 she became Fellow of the Royal Society of Chemistry.

In 1923 Leslie married Alfred Hamilton Burr, a chemist at Salford. In 1929 she left Leeds to stay with her husband and returned to Leeds only after his death in 1933. She died four years later on 3 July 1937.

Main publications

References
5.https://books.google.co.uk/books?id=AMc4n2Y7ILkC&pg=PA76&dq=May+Sybil+Leslie&hl=en&sa=X&redir_esc=y#v=onepage&q=May%20Sybil%20Leslie&f=false  Book:            Devotion to their science:The Pioneer Women of Radioactivity

1887 births
1937 deaths
English chemists
Alumni of the University of Leeds